Akola Airport  is an airport located in Akola in the Indian state of Maharashtra. The airport can currently said to be non-functional for public use, as of now no public airplane services are available in Akola. It is natively called Dr. Panjabrao Deshmukh Domestic Airport, named after the first State Agriculture Minister of India.

History
The airport was constructed in 1943 by the Public Works Department. Airlines such as Vayudoot and Span Aviation had operated out of Akola in the past. The airport was developed in 2008 at an estimated cost of Rs 25 crore. A new terminal building, renovated at a cost of Rs 1.5 crore, has a new fire station, air traffic control block and other vital installations.

Structure
Akola airport has a part concrete, part asphalt, or part bitumen-bound macadam runway oriented 10/28, 4000 ft long and 100 ft wide. The 90-metre by 100-metre apron can accommodate two Fokker F27 - sized aircraft.

See also

 Amravati Airport

References

External links 
 
 Akola Airport  at Airports Authority of India web site

Defunct airports in India
Airports in Maharashtra
Akola
1943 establishments in India
Vidarbha